The 2008 Asian Men's Volleyball Cup, so-called 2008 AVC Cup for Men was the inaugural edition of the Asian Cup, played by top eight teams of the 2007 Asian Championship. The tournament was held at MCC Hall Convention Center, Nakhon Ratchasima, Thailand from 20 to 26 September 2008.

Pools composition
The teams are seeded based on their final ranking at the 2007 Asian Men's Volleyball Championship.

Venue
 MCC Hall Convention Center, Nakhon Ratchasima, Thailand

Preliminary round

Pool A

|}

|}

Pool B

|}

|}

Final round

Quarterfinals

|}

5th–8th semifinals

|}

Semifinals

|}

7th place

|}

5th place

|}

3rd place

|}

Final

|}

Final standing

Team Roster
Mojtaba Attar, Saeid Marouf, Javad Mohammadinejad, Arash Keshavarzi, Hamzeh Zarini, Mohammad Mohammadkazem, Alireza Nadi, Ahsanollah Shirkavand, Mansour Zadvan, Farhad Nazari Afshar, Mehdi Mahdavi, Mohammad Mousavi
Head Coach: Hossein Maadani

Awards
MVP:  Hamzeh Zarini
Best Scorer:  Yasuyuki Shibakoya
Best Spiker:  Park Chul-woo
Best Server:  Cui Jianjun
Best Setter:  Saranchit Charoensuk
Best Receiver:  Yeo Oh-hyun
Best Digger:  Chien Wei-lun
Best Libero:  Yeo Oh-hyun

External links
Asian Volleyball Confederation

2008
2008 in volleyball
2008 Asian Men's Cup
Volleyball,Asian Men's Cup